Monica Lennon ( Ward; born 7 January 1981) is a Scottish politician who has served as a Member of the Scottish Parliament (MSP) for the Central Scotland region since 2016. A member of the Scottish Labour Party, she has served in various roles on the Scottish Labour front bench. She was the Scottish Labour Spokesperson for Health and Sport from 2018 to 2021, Scottish Labour Spokesperson for Economy, Jobs and Fair Work from March 2021 to June 2021 and Scottish Labour Spokesperson for Net Zero, Energy and Transport from June 2021 to November 2021. She was a candidate in the 2021 Scottish Labour leadership election and currently serves on the Scottish Parliament's Net Zero, Energy and Transport Committee.

Early life and career 
Lennon was born in Bellshill and raised in Blantyre, South Lanarkshire, the daughter of Gerard Ward, a council health and safety manager, and his wife Helen. She attended the co-educational Roman Catholic John Ogilvie High School in Hamilton. She studied environmental planning at the University of Strathclyde, graduating with a Bachelor of Arts degree in 2001. While studying she lived with her father. Her parents had separated, and later divorced, as a result of her father's drinking which developed into severe alcoholism.

From 2001 to 2007, Lennon worked as a planning officer for South Lanarkshire Council. She married at the age of 24 but felt forced to exclude her father from the wedding because of his alcoholism; he died at the age of 60. 

After leaving South Lanarkshire Council, she worked as a surveyor for commercial property consultancy Knight Frank, also freelancing as a planning consultant, until her election in 2012.

Political career 
In the 2012 South Lanarkshire Council election, Lennon was elected to represent the Hamilton North and East ward. In the 2016 Scottish Parliament election, she was second on Scottish Labour's Central Scotland regional list and was elected as a Member of the Scottish Parliament. Shortly after being elected she was appointed by leader Kezia Dugdale as Shadow Minister for Inequalities, a role in which she campaigned to raise awareness about the need for women to check themselves for signs of breast cancer.

In the 2017 Scottish Labour leadership election, Lennon nominated fellow Central Scotland MSP and left-wing ally Richard Leonard. In December 2017, Leonard announced his new frontbench in which she was promoted to Spokesperson for Communities and Local Government.

In November 2017, Lennon went public with how she was sexually assaulted by a Labour colleague at a party in 2013, while other colleagues brushed off the incident. Following revelations of similar incidents within the party, she argued that the party and British politics had an institutional problem with sexual assault and harassment.

On 6 September 2018, Lennon made a speech in which she spoke of a constituent who had committed suicide shortly after Christmas 2017. The constituent pleaded with health services for help eight times in the six days directly before he died, but was either turned away or referred elsewhere. Lennon asked Nicola Sturgeon to take urgent action to review suicide prevention procedures in NHS Lanarkshire.

In an October 2018 Shadow Cabinet reshuffle, Lennon was again promoted to Spokesperson for Health and Sport, replacing Richard Leonard's former leadership rival Anas Sarwar. She used the position to campaign for institutions to provide free menstrual hygiene products, to tackle period poverty. The Period Products (Free Provision) (Scotland) Act was enacted in November 2020.

Along with Neil Findlay, Lennon abstained on an SNP government bill in favour of a second Scottish independence referendum. This was against their party's whip, which was to vote against the bill.

Following the resignation of Richard Leonard, Lennon joined the 2021 Scottish Labour leadership election. During the campaign, Lennon said she would not oppose a second Scottish independence referendum although would argue for an alternative Devo Max option. She commented that the war on drugs had failed and drug laws should be devolved to Scotland and drugs decriminalised. She also said people across the UK "deserve a public health approach that meets their needs". She pledged to end the care home "dementia tax" and said Scottish Labour with her as leader would commit to reviewing social care policies to ensure people with advanced dementia receive equal treatment. She has backed Alzheimer Scotland's Fair Dementia Care campaign. She was defeated by her rival Anas Sarwar.

In 2020, Lennon was selected as the Scottish Labour candidate in Hamilton, Larkhall and Stonehouse in the 2021 Scottish Parliament election. She was defeated by incumbent Christina McKelvie of the SNP, but was re-elected via the Central region list.

In the wake of anti-abortion protests in Glasgow in the Spring of 2022, Lennon called for an emergency summit in Holyrood.

Personal life 
Lennon is married to Jim Lennon and has one daughter, Isabella. She is a feminist and a vegetarian, and suffers from ailurophobia, an irrational fear of cats.

References

External links 
 

1981 births
Living people
People from Bellshill
Alumni of the University of Strathclyde
Scottish urban planners
Women urban planners
Labour MSPs
Members of the Scottish Parliament 2016–2021
Members of the Scottish Parliament 2021–2026
Female members of the Scottish Parliament
Scottish Labour councillors
Councillors in South Lanarkshire
Politicians from South Lanarkshire
People from Blantyre, South Lanarkshire
People educated at John Ogilvie High School
Women councillors in Scotland